Denguélé District is one of fourteen administrative districts of Ivory Coast. The district is located in the northwest corner of the country. The capital of the district is Odienné.

Creation
Denguélé District was created in a 2011 administrative reorganisation of the subdivisions of Ivory Coast. The territory of the district was composed of the former Denguélé Region.

Administrative divisions
Denguélé District is currently subdivided into two regions and the following departments:
 Folon Region (region seat in Minignan)
 Kaniasso Department
 Minignan Department
 Kabadougou Region (region seat also in Odienné)
 Gbéléban Department
 Madinani Department
 Odienné Department
 Samatiguila Department
 Séguélon Department

Population
According to the 2021 census, Denguélé District has a population of 436,015, making it the second least populated district of the country behind Yamoussoukro Autonomous District.

References

 
Districts of Ivory Coast
States and territories established in 2011